is a private university in Yokkaichi, Mie, Japan. The predecessor of the school, women's school, was founded in 1946, and it was chartered as a university in 1988.

External links
 Official website 

Educational institutions established in 1946
Private universities and colleges in Japan
Universities and colleges in Mie Prefecture
1946 establishments in Japan